Hajar Saad Al-Khaldi (born 17 March 1995) is a Bahraini sprinter. She competed in the women's 100 metres event at the 2016 Summer Olympics.

References

External links
 

1995 births
Living people
Bahraini female sprinters
Place of birth missing (living people)
Athletes (track and field) at the 2016 Summer Olympics
Athletes (track and field) at the 2014 Asian Games
Athletes (track and field) at the 2018 Asian Games
Asian Games medalists in athletics (track and field)
Asian Games gold medalists for Bahrain
Medalists at the 2018 Asian Games
Olympic athletes of Bahrain